The New Hampshire Department of Agriculture, Markets, and Food is a state agency of the U.S. state of New Hampshire, headquartered in Concord. The department's mission is "to support and promote agriculture and serve consumers and business for the benefit of the public health, environment and economy."

Organization
The department is organized into six divisions:
 Division of Agricultural Development
 Division of Animal Industry
 Division of Pesticide Control
 Division of Plant Industry
 Division of Regulatory Services
 Division of Weights and Measures

Administratively attached to the department are the New Hampshire Agriculture in the Classroom program and the State Conservation Committee.

Commissioners
The department has had seven commissioners since it was formed in 1913:
 Andrew L. Felker of Meredith (1913–1953)
 Perley I. Fitts of Durham (1953–1962)
 Frank T. Buckley of Derry (1962–1972)
 Howard C. Townsend of Lebanon (1972–1982)
 Stephen H. Taylor of Plainfield (1982–2007)
 Lorraine S. Merrill of Stratham (2007–2017)
 Shawn N. Jasper of Hudson (2017–present)

References

External links

Agriculture, Markets, and Food
1913 establishments in New Hampshire
Government agencies established in 1913